Microcymaturini is a tribe of longhorn beetles of the subfamily Lamiinae. It was described by Breuning and Téocchi in 1985. It consists of a single genus, Microcymatura, and the following species:

 Microcymatura antennalis Breuning, 1950
 Microcymatura discalis Breuning, 1968
 Microcymatura flavipennis Báguena & Breuning, 1958
 Microcymatura flavodiscalis Báguena & Breuning, 1958
 Microcymatura holonigra Breuning, 1954
 Microcymatura macrophthalma Báguena & Breuning, 1958

References

Lamiinae